Eligio B. Lofranco, known as Dong/Lieux, (born December 1, 1943 in Loon, Bohol) was a Filipino Polymath, a Public Prosecutor in Quezon City and later became a Division Chief. Lieux was born in Loon, Bohol. The 3rd of the 13 children born to a wealthy family. He was a poet, a writer, a labor leader, bowler, painter, and fisherman.

Biography

Early life and education
Lieux was born on December 1, 1943 in Loon, Bohol to Sergio Lofranco, a local guerrilla dentist, and Susana Bananola, a former public servant. He completed his primary education at Calape Elementary School and secondary education at Bohol Provincial Institute (Salutatorian). In college, he went to the University of the Bohol in Tagbilaran, Bohol where he earned his Associate in Arts in 1965 (Cum Laude) major in English, a Bachelor of Science in Education major in History in 1967, a Bachelor of Laws degree in 1972 and took 18 Units for his MBA.

Career
From 1965 to 1975, Lieux worked as a high school teacher and Secretary of Bohol Chamber of Commerce at the same university. He then became a Right Of Way agent in 1976 for National Power Corporation. From 1980 to 1991 he became a Supervising Row Agent, a Row Assistant B, a Senior Corporate and Trial Attorney, and a Senior Employee Relations Specialist. From 1985-1990 he was a Special Attorney to the Office of The Solicitor General. In 1992 he became a Public Prosecutor and was recognized for his good service and citizenship for 3 decades. He was also a professor at FEU-FERN and taught Legal and Judicial Ethics, Criminal Law and Civil & Criminal Procedure. He recently retired from service in 2008 and now works as a private practitioner in his Law Office (Lofranco Law Office). In April 2010, he came back to serve the government as a Chief of Staff of a Commissioner in NAPOLCOM.

References

1943 births
Living people
20th-century Filipino lawyers
Writers from Bohol
Artists from Bohol
People from Quezon City
21st-century Filipino lawyers